Onward is a 2020 American computer-animated urban fantasy adventure film produced by Pixar Animation Studios and distributed by Walt Disney Studios Motion Pictures. The film was directed by Dan Scanlon, produced by Kori Rae, and written by Scanlon, Jason Headley, and Keith Bunin. The film stars the voices of Tom Holland, Chris Pratt, Julia Louis-Dreyfus, and Octavia Spencer. Set in a suburban fantasy world for the modern day, the film follows two elf brothers named Ian and Barley Lightfoot (Holland and Pratt) who set out on a quest to find an artifact that will temporarily bring back their deceased father named Wilden (Bornheimer) for twenty-four hours before the time is up. Along the way, their journey is filled with cryptic maps, impossible obstacles and unimaginable discoveries.

After directing Monsters University (2013), Scanlon was encouraged to develop personal stories. The concept of Onward is inspired by the death of Scanlon's father, who died in a car accident when Scanlon and his older brother were very young children, and their relationship with each other. He began to write the story after hearing an audio clip of his father. The film was announced at D23 Expo in July 2017, with the title being revealed in December 2018, alongside the voice cast. The animation team chose to give the film's magic a unique style after studying several animated films featuring magic in order to fit with its suburban setting. Development on Onward lasted for six years, on an approximate between $175-200 million budget. Composers Mychael and Jeff Danna were hired to compose the film's musical score, with Brandi Carlile contributing an original song for the film.

Onward premiered at the 70th Berlin International Film Festival on February 21, 2020, and was theatrically released in the United States on March 6, 2020. The film received generally positive reviews from critics, but underperformed at the box office, grossing only $142 million worldwide against its between $175–200 million budget. The COVID-19 pandemic contributed to its financial shortcomings, due to the widespread closure of theatres. Like several other films released in the early months of 2020, it found far greater success on VOD. The film was nominated for Best Animated Feature Film at the 78th Golden Globe Awards and 93rd Academy Awards, but lost both awards to Soul, another Pixar film released in the same year. Onward was the last Pixar film released in theaters worldwide until Lightyear in June 2022.

Plot

In a world inhabited by mythic creatures, magic was commonplace millennia ago, though difficult to master. After technological advances over the centuries, magic became obsolete and was largely discarded.

In the modern day, Ian Lightfoot is a teenaged elf struggling with self-confidence; his older brother, Barley, is an enthusiastic and impulsive role-playing gamer, who lived in the city of New Mushroomton. On Ian's sixteenth birthday, the boys' mother, Laurel, gives her sons a gift from their father, Wilden, who died shortly before Ian was born: a magical staff, a rare Phoenix gem, and a letter describing a "visitation spell" that can resurrect Wilden for a single day. Ian succeeds in casting the spell but, interrupted by Barley, is unable to finish it. As a result, only the lower half of Wilden's body is reformed before the gem disintegrates. The brothers embark on a quest to acquire another gem and complete the spell before sunset, taking Barley's beloved van "Guinevere." Finding the boys gone, Laurel leaves to look for them.

Hoping to find a map to another gem, Ian and Barley visit the Manticore's Tavern–once a gathering-place for would-be adventurers, now a family restaurant managed by the Manticore ("Corey"). While arguing with Ian over the map, Corey realizes how unfulfilling her life has become and loses her temper, accidentally setting fire to the restaurant and the map. The brothers' only clue to the gem is a children's menu suggesting "Raven's Point," a nearby mountain. Laurel later arrives at the scene and befriends Corey, who warns Laurel that the gem is guarded by a curse that can only be defeated by an enchanted sword. After stealing the sword from a pawn shop, they set out in pursuit of Ian and Barley.

Traveling to the mountains, Barley proposes following what he calls the "Path of Peril", but Ian insists on taking the freeway. As they travel, Ian begins mastering magic spells that Barley remembers from his role-playing game. They narrowly escape a motorcycle gang of pixies at a gas station and have a tense encounter with the police, which the boys disguise themselves as their mother's boyfriend, Colt Bronco, during which Ian inadvertently reveals that he considers Barley to be a screw-up. To apologize, Ian agrees to follow the Path of Peril. Ian's self-confidence is boosted when he successfully uses a spell that allows him to walk across a bottomless pit, where, unbeknownst to him, he was walking without the rope that Barley tied him to over the second half of the pit. Bronco catches up to the boys and forces them to come home, Ian agrees, but as he starts the van, he drives away, leading to a wild police chase. When they are pursued by the police, Barley sacrifices Guinevere to cause a landslide, blocking their pursuers.

"Raven's Point" turns out to be a series of raven statues leading them into a cave. As they explore the cave, Barley confesses that he was too afraid to say goodbye to Wilden when he was dying. The brothers evade a series of traps, including a Gelatinous Cube that dissolves anything it touches. Emerging from the cave, they find themselves back in front of Ian's high school.

Ian lashes out at Barley for leading them on a wild goose chase and walks away with Wilden's legs to spend whatever time he has left with his father. Rereading his list of things he wished to do with Wilden, Ian realizes that Barley has been a father figure for him throughout his life and returns to make amends. Barley, refusing to give up, discovers the needed gem inside a fountain across the street from the school and retrieves it, unwittingly triggering the curse Corey spoke of: a stone dragon, built of pieces of the school building, bent on claiming the gem. Corey and Laurel arrive and distract the dragon long enough for Ian to finish casting the visitation spell, but they aren't able to defeat the dragon on their own. Ian runs off to fight it, allowing Barley to wish Wilden a final goodbye. He uses the magic skills he has learned to defeat the dragon by propelling Corey's sword into its heart. Trapped behind a pile of rubble, Ian sees Wilden's body briefly reappearing to talk to Barley. After Wilden dissipates, Barley tells Ian that their father is proud of him, and the brothers share a hug.

Some time later, as the world begins to rediscover the past's magical arts, the brothers set off on a new quest.

Voice cast
 Tom Holland as Ian Lightfoot, a teenage elf.
 Chris Pratt as Barley Lightfoot, Ian's older brother, who longs for a magical quest.
 Julia Louis-Dreyfus as Laurel Lightfoot, the widowed mother of Ian and Barley
 Octavia Spencer as "Corey" The Manticore, a manticore who is the proprietor of the Manticore's Tavern.
 Kyle Bornheimer as Wilden Lightfoot, Ian and Barley's late father. Ian and Barley's objective is to resurrect him for 24 hours.
 Mel Rodriguez as Colt Bronco, a centaur police officer and Laurel's boyfriend.
 Lena Waithe as Specter, a lesbian cyclops police officer.
 Ali Wong as Gore, a faun police officer.
 Grey Griffin as Dewdrop, a pixie and the leader of the Pixie Dusters biker gang.
 Tracey Ullman as Grecklin, a goblin pawn shop owner.
 Wilmer Valderrama as Gaxton, an elf and college friend of Wilden.
 George Psarras as Avel, an elf police officer.
 John Ratzenberger as Fenwick, a cyclops construction worker. This is, to date, Ratzenberger's final role in a Pixar feature film after a 25 year partnership with the company.

Production

Development 
While directing Monsters University (2013), Dan Scanlon was encouraged to develop personal stories. He did not talk to his brother about the film, because he wanted to keep him in the dark as these movies take so long to make. In July 2017, Pixar announced a "suburban fantasy world" film at the D23 Expo, with Scanlon directing and Kori Rae producing. The film was inspired by the death of Scanlon's father, when he and his older brother were very young children, and their relationship with each other. He decided to write the story after hearing an audio clip of his father. On December 12, 2018, the title was revealed. In 2019, Jason Headley and Keith Bunin were hired to rewrite the screenplay and story. According to Scanlon, Onward spent six years in development.

Casting 
On December 12, 2018, Tom Holland, Chris Pratt, Julia Louis-Dreyfus and Octavia Spencer were announced as starring in the film. While having recorded most of their lines separately, Holland and Pratt had some of their recording sessions together since, according to Scanlon, "they've worked together before and hung out together." Rae stated that Holland and Pratt improvised some of their lines while recording together. On December 17, 2019, Ali Wong, Lena Waithe and Mel Rodriguez joined the cast of the film. On February 18, 2020, Wilmer Valderrama, Tracey Ullman, Kyle Bornheimer, and George Psarras were revealed to have voice roles as well, and John Ratzenberger's appearance was officially confirmed.

Deleted scene 
One storyboard scene featured Ian, Barley, and Wilden joining with a goat girl in the journey. Ian and the goat girl come across a booth hosted by three evil mermaids. The mermaids sing their mesmerizing song to lure the two into staying in one of three houses put for rent. Ian tries to silence them with the staff but the spell is too weak. When Ian and the goat girl are finally in a trance, the mermaids place them in one of the houses. The house they are in starts to sink into the ground.

The goat girl was omitted because the filmmakers wanted the film to focus on the relationship between Ian and Barley. The scene itself was removed because the filmmakers felt it was too grim.

Animation 
According to effects supervisor Vincent Serritella, the animators wanted the spells to be "something that's abstract" but also "personify it", so they "had to converge on the idea of an image of magic, go back to the base level of the sequences and the spells, and what level [of complexity] would be given, and how it affects the environment". Director Dan Scanlon said that Ian's arc "was helpful to [the animators] because [they] could use that for all of the magic we designed". The animators chose to give the film's magic a unique style after studying several animated films featuring magic such as Fantasia, Aladdin, and Hercules. Animators wanted the film's magic to fit with its suburban setting.

Animators first developed the film's magic using hand-drawn animated drawings, before turning them into computer-animated effects, with Serritella saying that "[they] made shapes and graphic elements that really lend themselves to what’s happening in a 2D environment". Serritella also said that "the key" was mixing hand-drawn and computer animation, arguing that "[g]oing one way or the other didn’t work. Going too graphic didn’t fit into the world that the background and the characters were created in. And going too physical in an animated world seemed too real", so "[they] found the right balance" by turning hand-drawn animated graphics into "light objects" and giving them "[a] true volumetric, glowing atmosphere". He further added that the choreography during the "visitation spell" sequence "came directly from 2D", while the CGI animation and lighting provided "depth perception". The film was completed on November 21, 2019.

Music 

On April 16, 2019, Mychael and Jeff Danna, who both previously worked with the studio on The Good Dinosaur (2015), were revealed to be the film's composers. On February 12, 2020, Brandi Carlile revealed she recorded the song "Carried Me With You" for the film's end credits, co-written with Phil and Tim Hanseroth. The film's soundtrack was released on February 28, 2020, seven days ahead of the film's release.

Marketing 
In the month of the release of the film, the world builder video game Disney Magic Kingdoms included a limited time "Onward Event" to promote it, with the characters involved in a new storyline unrelated to the events of the film, including Ian, Barley, Wilden (referred to as "Dad"), Laurel, The Manticore, Officer Colt and Blazey as playable characters, in addition to some attractions based on locations of the film.

Release

Theatrical
Onward premiered at the 70th Berlin International Film Festival on February 21, 2020 and was theatrically released in the United States on March 6. A short film titled Playdate with Destiny, which is centered around Maggie Simpson from The Simpsons, appeared before the feature film. As the COVID-19 pandemic appeared to recede, the film was released in Australia and New Zealand on April 24, 2020, South Korea on June 17, 2020, Italy on August 19, 2020, and Japan on August 21, 2020..

The movie was also released in 3D, 2D, Dolby Cinema, 4DX and ScreenX worldwide and in IMAX and Dolby Atmos in selected theaters.

Ban and censorship 

The film was banned in the Arab countries of Kuwait, Oman, Qatar, and Saudi Arabia, as one female cyclops police officer character in the film named Specter (voiced by Lena Waithe) briefly indicates that she is a lesbian. The scene in question is a brief scene in which a simulacrum of Colt Bronco is lamenting about how Ian and Barley Lightfoot do not respect him as a father figure. Specter replies to him by saying, "It's not easy being a new parent—my girlfriend's daughter got me pulling my hair out, okay?" Homosexual acts are criminalized in the four countries, which are predominantly Muslim, although Kuwait does not criminalize female homosexual acts. The ban is not universal, and the film was screened in Bahrain, the United Arab Emirates, Lebanon, and Egypt, albeit the line was changed in the Arabic dub to "my sister's daughter".

The Russian dub, due to the Russian gay propaganda law officially criminalizing the dissemination of LGBT-related content to minors under 18, changed the line to "my partner's daughter". The Russian dub also avoided referring to Specter with gender-specific pronouns. The scene was also changed similarly in Poland and Hungary.

Home media
Onward was released digitally on the night of March 20, 2020, and became available for Disney+ subscribers on April 3, 2020 due to the COVID-19 pandemic. The digital date was just two weeks after the film's theatrical debut and before the end of the usual 90-day theatrical run. The announcement followed Disney's earlier than planned release of Frozen II on Disney+ as well as Star Wars: The Rise of Skywalker on Digital HD in light of the COVID-19 pandemic. Over its first week of home release, the film was the sixth-most watched on Amazon Prime and second-most on the iTunes Store. The film was later released by Walt Disney Studios Home Entertainment on DVD, Blu-ray, and Ultra HD Blu-ray on May 19, 2020.

Reception

Box office
Onward grossed $61.6 million in the United States and Canada, and $80.4 million in other territories, for a worldwide total of $142 million. The gross of the film was significantly affected by the COVID-19 pandemic, which first reduced movie theater attendance, then forced most to shut down within two weeks of the film's release.

In the United States and Canada, the film was released alongside The Way Back and the wide expansion of Emma, and was projected to gross $45–50 million from 4,200 theaters in its opening weekend. The film held early advance screenings on February 29, making $650,000 from 470 theaters. It then grossed $12.1 million on its first day, the 6th, including $2 million from Thursday night previews. The film went on to debut to $39.1 million, topping the box office but marking the third-ever lowest start for a Pixar film. While the film remained in first in its second weekend, it dropped 73% to $10.5 million (the worst-ever second weekend for a Pixar film), and was part of the lowest grossing box office weekend since October 1998, with all films combining for just $55.3 million. In the film's third weekend, due to the mass theater closures around the country, it made $71,000 from 135 locations, mostly drive-in theaters.

Critical response
The website's critics consensus reads, "It may suffer in comparison to Pixar's classics, but Onward makes effective use of the studio's formula – and stands on its own merits as a funny, heartwarming, dazzlingly animated adventure." On Metacritic, the film has a weighted average score of 61 out of 100, based on 56 critics, indicating "generally favorable reviews." Audiences polled by CinemaScore gave the film an average grade of "A−" on an A+ to F scale (tied with Cars 2 for the lowest score received by a Pixar film), and PostTrak reported filmgoers gave it 4.5 out of 5 stars.

Peter Bradshaw of The Guardian rated the film three out of five stars, and called it "a likable family comedy that finds an easy rhythm without effort," though he felt that the movie's "attitude towards death" is not as radically powerful as in Coco. In a same star review Peter Travers of Rolling Stone said "It's no Toy Story—but the animation juggernaut's latest, about two elf brothers on a quest, is still worth your while." Reviewer James Berardinelli praised the film's originality and emotional weight and called it "engaging and enjoyable," adding "there’s something here for everyone," though concluded it is not the next Disney/Pixar classic. Ben Travis of Empire gave the film five out of five stars, and wrote, "Pixar returns with a great big power-chord of a movie—heart-pumping, resonant, and positively harmonious."

Richard Roeper of the Chicago Sun-Times called Onward a step back for Pixar, giving it two out of four stars. He said, "The story fluctuates between the uninspired and the just plain weird and then gets even weirder." While he praised the animation and said that the movie "begins with an intriguing premise," he concluded that it "doesn't come close to fully fleshing out the possibilities."

Year-end lists
 1st – Kyle Smith – National Review
 5th – Max Evry – Comingsoon.net
 7th – Johnny Oleksinski – New York Post

Accolades

Lawsuit 

In January 2020, San Francisco tattoo artist Sweet Cicely Daniher filed a copyright lawsuit against Disney, Pixar, and Onward producer Kori Rae. In September 2018, Pixar rented Daniher's "Vanicorn," a van decorated with a unicorn-themed mural, for use at the LA Auto Show in 2019. She learned about the production of Onward in May 2019 and, after seeing images of the van used by Ian and Barley Lightfoot in the film, came to believe that Pixar had copied the design of the Vanicorn in violation of her rental agreement with the company, as well as the Digital Millennium Copyright Act, the Visual Artists Rights Act, and the California Artists Protection Act. She sought in her suit to prohibit distribution of the film and any infringing advertisement or merchandise.

Notes

References

External links 
 
 

2020 3D films
2020 computer-animated films
2020 films
2020 fantasy films
2020s American animated films
2020s fantasy comedy films
2020s teen comedy films
2020s English-language films
American 3D films
American adventure comedy films
American animated comedy films
American animated fantasy films
American computer-animated films
American fantasy adventure films
American fantasy comedy films
American teen comedy films
American urban fantasy films
American high fantasy films
American epic fantasy films
American animated feature films
Animated teen films
Animated films about brothers
Animated films about magic
Censored films
Disney controversies
Films about elves
Films about legendary creatures
Films about size change
Films directed by Dan Scanlon
Films scored by Jeff Danna
Films scored by Mychael Danna
Films with screenplays by Dan Scanlon
Film controversies
LGBT-related controversies in animation
LGBT-related controversies in film
Pixar animated films
Walt Disney Pictures animated films
2020s teen fantasy films
IMAX films
4DX films
ScreenX films